Ten referendums were held in Switzerland during 1999. The first four were held on 7 February on changes to the eligibility for membership of the Federal Council (approved), constitutional regulations on organ transplantation (approved), a popular initiative "house ownership for everyone" (rejected) and an amendment to the federal law on spatial planning (approved). The fifth was held on 18 April on a new Swiss Federal Constitution, which was approved.

The last five referendums were held on 13 June on the asylum law (approved), on a federal resolution on asylum and foreigners (approved), a federal resolution on the medical prescription of heroin (approved), federal laws on disability and maternity insurance (both rejected).

Background

New constitution
The proposed new constitution would sever the link between gold and the Swiss franc, which had been required by the old constitution.

The Swiss National Bank was the last central bank to hold substantial gold reserves to back its currency. The 2590 tonnes of gold provided 40% of the value of the franc.

Results

Aftermath
The new constitution approved in April made the franc fully fiat, and the Swiss National Bank began selling its gold reserves. Some of the proceeds were used to set up a "solidarity fund" with developing nations. By November, the gold stockpile was reduced to 25%.

References

Referendums
Switzerland
Referendums in Switzerland